These are the singles that reached number one on the Top 100 Singles chart in 1995 as published by Cash Box magazine.

See also
1995 in music
List of Hot 100 number-one singles of 1995 (U.S.)

References
https://web.archive.org/web/20110818051844/http://cashboxmagazine.com/archives/90s_files/1995.html

1995
United States Cash Box Top 100
1995 in American music